The Democratic Union for Revival was a political party in Georgia.

The party acquired its current name in 1998, having operated since 1992 under the chairmanship of Aslan Abashidze and the name "Adjaran Union for the rebirth of Georgia" ("საქართველოს აღორძინების აჭარის კავშირი").

The party ceased to exist following the 2004 Adjarian revolution.

Political platform

The party represented regional interests and demanded greater autonomy of the bodies of the Autonomous Republic of Adjara from the central government. According to the party, the economic growth along with the market economy should be encouraged by the state bodies through social guarantees.

References

Defunct political parties in Georgia (country)
Social democratic parties in Georgia (country)
Centre-left parties in Georgia (country)